David Robert Merrington (born 26 January 1945) is an English former professional footballer who later worked as a commentator for BBC Radio Solent.

Playing career
Merrington played for Burnley, appearing in 98 league games (1 goal), including a spell as captain. He later played for Bristol City before retiring and going into coaching.

Coaching career
Merrington was a brief caretaker manager for Sunderland following the departure of Jimmy Adamson in 1978, and in 1980 he again took over from Adamson as caretaker manager (for 1 game only) at Leeds United.

He became youth coach at Southampton in 1983, before taking over as manager for the 1995–96 season. He was Premiership Manager of the Month in April 1996, his only full season in management. Despite securing Southampton's top flight status on goal difference, he was dismissed on 14 June 1996 and succeeded by Graeme Souness. During the final weeks of the 1995–96 season, he guided Southampton to two crucial wins which played a big part in their survival - they first beat Manchester United (champions that season) 3–1 at The Dell, and then won their penultimate game 1–0 at Bolton Wanderers, a result which confirmed the other side's relegation.

A year later he returned to the club as a coach under next manager Dave Jones but left again three years later after Jones was succeeded by Glenn Hoddle. His next stop was a brief spell working as Walsall's first-team coach alongside manager Colin Lee in 2002.

Media career
Merrington worked for BBC Radio Solent, commentating on Southampton matches. Merrington retired from commentary at the end of the 2021–22 season.

Honours

Manager
Individual
Premier League Manager of the Month: April 1996

References

External links

 

Living people
1945 births
English footballers
Footballers from Newcastle upon Tyne
Association football central defenders
English Football League players
Burnley F.C. players
Bristol City F.C. players
English football managers
Premier League managers
Sunderland A.F.C. managers
Southampton F.C. managers
Walsall F.C. non-playing staff
English Football League managers
Burnley F.C. non-playing staff
Leeds United F.C. managers